Phyllonorycter drepanota is a moth of the family Gracillariidae. It is known from the Nepal and Uttarakhand, India.

The wingspan is 5.5–7 mm.

The larvae feed on Engelhardia spicata. They mine the leaves of their host plant. The mine has the form of a rather small occurring upon the upper surface of the leaf. It is oval or elliptical and always elongate along the middle vein. The upper epidermis of the leaf on the mining part is brownish-white, with a longitudinal ridge in accomplished condition.

References

drepanota
Moths of Asia
Moths described in 1973